Leonie Benesch (born 22 April 1991 in Hamburg) is a German actress who has played roles in major productions including Babylon Berlin and The Crown, as well as Around the World in 80 Days. She is currently based in London.

Biography
In 2009, Benesch played the role of Eva in the film The White Ribbon, which won the Golden Palm. Film critics singled out her performance as "a discovery". She received the American "Young Artist Award" for her work,  as well as a "New Faces Award". In 2010, she performed in Philip Koch's drama Picco and in Sophie Heldman's film  (Satte Farben vor Schwarz), where she worked alongside Senta Berger and Bruno Ganz.

In 2017, Benesch performed in Babylon Berlin as Greta Overbeck, winning the "German Acting Prize". Benesch also performed in The Crown as the sister of Prince Philip, Princess Cecilie of Greece and Denmark. In 2020, she was cast in the BBC miniseries Around the World in 80 Days, alongside David Tennant as Phileas Fogg  and Ibrahim Koma as Passepartout.

Personal life
Benesch grew up in Tübingen, and attended the Freie Waldorfschule. She also attended the Guildhall School of Music and Drama in London.  She is of French and Transylvanian descent.

Filmography

Film

Television

Awards and nominations

References

External links

Living people
1991 births
21st-century German actresses
Actresses from Hamburg
Alumni of the Guildhall School of Music and Drama
German expatriates in England
German film actresses
German people of French descent
German people of Romanian descent
German television actresses